Pseudozelota punctipennis is a species of beetle in the family Cerambycidae. It was described by Bernhard Schwarzer in 1930, originally under the genus Acanthocacia.

References

Mesosini
Beetles described in 1930